Wilbur E. Hurlbut (born October 19, 1867, in Franklin County, Vermont) was a member of the Wisconsin State Assembly. He served during the 1911 and 1913 sessions. Additionally during this time, he was a delegate to the 1912 Republican National Convention. Other positions he held include superintendent of public schools of Northfield, Vermont and lawyer.

References

External links
The Political Graveyard
Wisconsin Historical Society

People from Franklin County, Vermont
People from Washington County, Vermont
Republican Party members of the Wisconsin State Assembly
Wisconsin lawyers
School superintendents in Vermont
Norwich University alumni
University of Michigan Law School alumni
1867 births
Year of death missing